Live Blackjazz is a live album by the Norwegian band Shining, released through Universal/ Indie Recordings on November 11, 2011.

Critical reception 

The live version of the album Blackjazz is smashing,
All About Jazz critique John Kelman, in his review of Shining's album Live Blackjazz states:
{| class="wikitable"
|-
|...  there's little doubt that his references are more Albert Ayler than Accept, more Brainkiller than Black Sabbath. Still, there's no doubting Munkeby and Shining's predilection for metal's defining characteristics, but there's an underlying intelligence that makes them more than just a fist-pumping, head-banging touchstone...
|}
Here the band culls five tracks from Blackjazz, and another five from Grindstone (2007) and In the Kingdom of Kitsch You Will Be a Monster'' (2005). This islive versions of tunes that differ markedly from recordings on previous studio albums, yet maintain the essential characteristics that are the hallmark of Shining's music.

The reviewer Mats Johnasen of MindOverMetal.org awarded the album 4.5 stars, and the Norwegian newspaper Dagbladet giving the album dice 5.

Track listing

CD version 
"Fisheye" (3:51)
"The Madness And The Damage Done" (5:42)
"In The Kingdom Of Kitsch You Will Be A Monster" (5:53)
"The Red Room" (3:03)
"Goretex Weather Report" (5:37)
"Winterreise" (6:13)
"Exit Sun" (9:35)
"Healter Skelter" (6:35)
"21st Century Schizoid Man" (11:57) - music by: Greg Lake, Ian McDonald, Michael Rex Giles, Peter John Sinfield & Robert Fripp

DVD version 
"The Madness And The Damage Done" (6:01)
"Fisheye" (7:46)
"In The Kingdom Of Kitsch You Will Be A Monster" (7:11)
"The Red Room" (3:08)
"Omen" (8:54)
"Goretex Weather Report" (5:37)
"Winterreise" (6:16)
"Exit Sun" (9:34)
"Healter Skelter" (6:41)
"21st Century Schizoid Man" (15:10) - music by: Greg Lake, Ian McDonald, Michael Rex Giles, Peter John Sinfield & Robert Fripp
"RMGDN" (19:53) - Encore

LP version 
Side A
"Fisheye" (3:51)
"The Madness And The Damage Done" (5:42)
"In The Kingdom Of Kitsch You Will Be A Monster" (5:53)
Side B
"The Red Room" (3:03)
"Omen" (8:54)
"Goretex Weather Report" (5:37)
Side C
"Winterreise" (6:13)
"Exit Sun" (9:35)
Side D
"Healter Skelter" (6:35)
"21st Century Schizoid Man" (11:57) - music by: Greg Lake, Ian McDonald, Michael Rex Giles, Peter John Sinfield & Robert Fripp

Personnel 
Jørgen Munkeby – Vocals, guitars, saxophone
Torstein Lofthus – Drums
Tor Egil Kreken – Bass
Bernt Moen – Keyboards
Håkon Sagen – Guitar

Credits 
Graphics design  – Trine + Kim Design Studio
Film director & editor – Anders Børresen (DVD)
Mastered by – Tom Baker
Mixed by – Sean Beavan
Music by – Jørgen Munkeby where not other are indicated
Producer – Jørgen Munkeby
Recorded by – Christian Snilsberg & Espen Høydalsvik

References

External links 
Fisheye single on Last.fm

Shining (Norwegian band) albums
2011 live albums